Nikos Tskouaseli (born 2 March 1970) is a Greek wrestler. He competed in the men's freestyle 48 kg at the 1996 Summer Olympics.

References

External links
 

1970 births
Living people
Greek male sport wrestlers
Olympic wrestlers of Greece
Wrestlers at the 1996 Summer Olympics
Place of birth missing (living people)
20th-century Greek people